The Sayward Forest canoe route runs through a series of lakes west of Campbell River.

It takes about three to five days to complete the full 48 kilometre circuit.   There are 13 portages totally about 7.6 kilometres of portaging.  Some of the portages allow for canoes to be wheeled.

The route passes through the following lakes in a loop:
Mohun Lake
Twin Lake
Amor Lake
Whymper Lake
Surprise Lake
Brewster Lake
Gray Lake
Fry Lake 
Lower Campbell Lake
Gosling Lake
Higgins Lake
Lawier Lake

References

External links
route details at Canadian Canoe Routes
Tourism site description of the route

Northern Vancouver Island
Canoeing in Canada